Arthur Digby Smith (16 November 1879 – 28 October 1963) was an Australian rules footballer who played for the South Melbourne Football Club in the Victorian Football League (VFL).

Family
The son of John Digby Smith (1829-1916), and Ann Eliza Smith (-1915), née Gibson, Arthur Digby Smith was born at Bairnsdale, Victoria on 16 November 1879.

He married Katherine Hooper (1892-1929) on 29 October 1914.

Football
He played his first senior game for South Melbourne against St Kilda on 4 May 1901.

Death
He died at a private hospital in Caulfield, Victoria on 28 October 1963.

Footnotes

References

External links 

1879 births
1963 deaths
Australian rules footballers from Victoria (Australia)
Sydney Swans players
Bairnsdale Football Club players
People from Bairnsdale